Huntingdon is a historic plantation house located at Roanoke, Virginia.  It was built about 1819, and is a -story, five bay, Federal style brick dwelling.   It has a central-passage-plan and an integral two-story rear ell.  The front and side elevations feature mid-19th century Greek Revival style porches. The house was restored and improved in 1988–1989. Also on the property is a contributing family cemetery and an outbuilding believed to have been a slave house.

It was listed on the National Register of Historic Places in 1991.

References

Plantation houses in Virginia
Houses on the National Register of Historic Places in Virginia
Greek Revival houses in Virginia
Federal architecture in Virginia
Houses completed in 1819
Houses in Roanoke, Virginia
National Register of Historic Places in Roanoke, Virginia